The Discobolus by Myron ("discus thrower", Diskobólos) is an Ancient Greek sculpture completed at the start of the Classical period at around 460–450 BC. The sculpture depicts a youthful male athlete throwing a discus. The bronze Greek original is lost. The work is known through its numerous Roman copies, both full-scale ones in marble, which is cheaper than bronze, such as the first to be recovered, the Palombara Discobolus, and smaller scaled versions in bronze.

The discus thrower is depicted as about to release his throw: "by sheer intelligence", Kenneth Clark observed in The Nude, "Myron has created the enduring pattern of athletic energy. He has taken a moment of action so transitory that students of athletics still debate if it is feasible, and he has given it the completeness of a cameo." The moment thus captured in the statue is an example of rhythmos, harmony and balance. Myron is often credited with being the first sculptor to master this style. Naturally, as always in Ancient Greek athletics, the Discobolus is completely nude. His pose is said to be unnatural to a human, and is considered as per modern standards a rather inefficient way to throw the discus. Myron represents the body at the moment of its maximum tension and splendor. The body torsion is vigorous and, at the same time, harmonious and delicate. However, the great effort of the athlete is not reflected in his face, which displays only a tenuous concentration. As Clark observes, "to a modern eye, it may seem that Myron's desire for perfection has made him suppress too rigorously the sense of strain in the individual muscles". The other trademark of Myron embodied in this sculpture is how well the body is proportioned the symmetria.

The potential energy expressed in this sculpture's tightly wound pose, expressing the moment of stasis just before the release, is an example of the advancement of Classical sculpture from Archaic. The torso shows no muscular strain, however, even though the limbs are outflung.

Reputation in the past 

Myron's Discobolus was long known from descriptions, such as the dialogue in Lucian of Samosata's work Philopseudes:

Discobolus and Discophorus
Prior to this statue's discovery, the term Discobolus had been applied in the 17th and 18th centuries to a standing figure holding a discus, a Discophoros, which Ennio Quirino Visconti identified as the Discobolus of Naukydes of Argos, mentioned by Pliny (Haskell and Penny 1981:200).

Discobolus Palombara or Lancellotti 
The Discobolus Palombara, the first copy of this famous sculpture to have been discovered, was found in 1781. It is a 1st-century AD copy of Myron's original bronze. Following its discovery at a Roman property of the Massimo family, the Villa Palombara on the Esquiline Hill, it was initially restored by Giuseppe Angelini; the Massimo installed it in their Palazzo Massimo alle Colonne and then at Palazzo Lancellotti. The Italian archaeologist Giovanni Battista Visconti identified the sculpture as a copy from the original of Myron. It was instantly famous, though the Massimo jealously guarded access to it (Haskell and Penny 1981:200).

In 1937, Adolf Hitler negotiated to buy it, and eventually succeeded in 1938, when Galeazzo Ciano, Minister of Foreign Affairs, sold it to him for five million lire, over the protests of Giuseppe Bottai, Minister of Education, and the scholarly community. It was shipped by rail to Munich and displayed in the Glyptothek; it was returned in 1948. It is now in the National Museum of Rome, displayed at the Palazzo Massimo.

Townley Discobolus 
After the discovery of the Discobolus Palombara a second notable Discobolus was excavated, at Hadrian's Villa in 1790, and was purchased by the English antiquary and art dealer established in Rome, Thomas Jenkins, at public auction in 1792. (Another example, also found at Tivoli at this date, was acquired by the Vatican Museums.) The English connoisseur Charles Townley paid Jenkins £400 for the statue, which arrived at the semi-public gallery Townley commissioned in Park Street, London, in 1794. The head was wrongly restored, as Richard Payne Knight soon pointed out, but Townley was convinced his was the original and better copy.

It was bought for the British Museum, with the rest of Townley's marbles, in July 1805.

Other copies 
Other Roman copies in marble have been recovered, and torsos that were already known in the 17th century but that had been wrongly restored and completed, have since been identified as further repetitions after Myron's model. For one such example, in the early 18th century Pierre-Étienne Monnot restored a torso that is now recognized as an example of Myron's Discobolus as a Wounded Gladiator who supports himself on his arm as he sinks to the ground; the completed sculpture was donated before 1734 by Pope Clement XII to the Capitoline Museums, where it remains.

Yet another copy was discovered in 1906 in the ruins of a Roman villa at Tor Paterno in the former royal estate of Castel Porziano, now also conserved in the Museo Nazionale Romano.

In the 19th century, plaster copies of Discobolos could be found in many large academic collections, now mostly dispersed.

Bodies: The Exhibition includes a recreation of the Discobolus. The Discus Thrower is plastinated human corpse posed like the original sculpture, discus included.

See also 
 Sport in ancient Greek art
 Discobolus (Harvard University)
 Discus Thrower (Washington, D.C.)

Notes and references

External links 

 Myron's Discobolus  A discussion about the sculpture between Dr. Beth Harris and Dr. Steven Zucker on video at Khan Academy/Smarthistory
 British Museum collection record, GR 1805.7-3.43 (Sculpture 250).
 Skulpturhalle, Basel collection record (German), 69-30/SH 948 
 Capitoline Museum collection record, MC0241
 3D preview

1781 archaeological discoveries
1790 archaeological discoveries
Townley collection
Sculptures of the Vatican Museums
Collections of the National Roman Museum
Roman copies of 5th-century BC Greek sculptures
Ancient Greek athletic art
Ancient Greek bronze statues of the classical period
Archaeological discoveries in Italy
Sculptures of sports
Nude sculptures